WYKG (1430 kHz) is a commercial AM radio station licensed to the suburb of Covington, Georgia. The station serves the Atlanta metropolitan area and is currently owned by Danny Wilson, through licensee Light Media Holdings, Inc.

WYKG currently broadcasts with 3,900 watts of power during the daytime.  But it drops to 212 watts at night, to avoid interfering with other stations on AM 1430.  It uses a non-directional antenna at all times.  Programming is also heard on FM translator station W288DX at 105.5 MHz, also in Covington.

The radio station is considered a Class B AM station by the Federal Communications Commission. On June 20, 2019, the WGFS call sign which had been in place since 1954 was changed to WYKG.

References

External links

YKG
Radio stations established in 1946
1946 establishments in Georgia (U.S. state)